How to Rule Your Own Country: The Weird and Wonderful World of Micronations is a non-fiction book written by Australian lawyers and legal academics Harry Hobbs and George Williams about micronationalism—exploring several micronations and their motivations for declaring independence. Published by the University of New South Wales Press, How to Rule Your Own Country is a follow-up to their 2021 book Micronations and the Search for Sovereignty. It was published as an e-book and in paperback format in November 2022 by the University of New South Wales Press.

Background and content 
Harry Hobbs and George Williams are Australian legal academics interested in the phenomenon of micronationalism. In December 2021, their book Micronations and the Search for Sovereignty was published by Cambridge University Press.

A follow-up, How to Rule Your Own Country was published as an e-book and in paperback format in November 2022 by the University of New South Wales Press. The book gives an overview on the topic of micronationalism and explores numerous micronations, extant and defunct, as well as their motivations for declaring sovereignty. It particularly deals with the disproportionate number of micronations located within Australia, which the authors attribute to "larrikin tradition [in Australia]" and the country's remoteness.

Reception 
Celina Ribeiro, writing for The Guardian, gave a positive review, writing "there is fair consideration for all the legalities, but Hobbs and Williams also give space to the farce of it all." Frank Bongiorno, writing for the Australian Book Review, gave a negative review, stating "I thought I was about to undertake an improving academic tour … [i]t turned out, however, that How to Rule Your Own Country is really a bit of a hoot, although one with a darker side." Bongiorno also criticised the work's explanation for the number of micronations in Australia, which Bongiorno attributed to colonialism and the Australian government's disregard towards Aboriginal sovereignty. Simon Caterson of The Sydney Morning Herald'''s weekly newsletter The Booklist also gave a positive review. He called the book "entertaining," adding that it "reveals that the ambition to rule your own country is expressed nowhere more often than in Australia."

 See also Micronations: The Lonely Planet Guide to Home-Made Nations''

References 

2022 non-fiction books
Works about micronations